Social work management is the management of organisations or enterprises in the social economy and non-profit sector, e.g., public service providers, charities, youth welfare offices, associations, etc. 
Social work management has been traditionally pursued by social workers, social pedagogues, pedagogues, psychologists without additional management skills and knowledge or legal practitioners and business economists – often without reference to the social economy. Furthermore, Social work management is a field of education & practice established since 1980s in Europe & North America that focuses on person-centred leadership, motivation & strategic issues. It manages organizations in social economy & non-profit sector.

Most scholars and practitioners agree that social work managers need to have a high degree of leadership skills to make considered managerial decisions, to empower social workers, to develop staff within and collaborate with partners outside the social and human service organisation. Social work management as a field of social work education and practice was established in many universities in Europe and North America  since the 1980s. Established qualifications in higher education first included diplomas in social economy. It originally focused on person-centred leadership, motivation and strategic issues. It combines management with social pedagogical, psychological, and sociological knowledge and skills.

Definition
In today's understanding, social management includes all management functions that are necessary for the management of social and/or non-profit organizations. This includes finance and accounting of social organizations, development of mission statements and concepts, city and social marketing, public relations, organizational development, human resource management, project management, quality management and other sub-disciplines of management and business administration.

In contrast to management in other industries, branches and areas of the economy (e.g. sports management or media and education management), social work management takes into account characteristics especially of organizations in the social sector: the provision of person-centered social services, the peculiarities of non-profit organizations and, in particular, labour and welfare services, the close integration into the social law as well as the character of the services as merit goods. With the increasing spread of private providers, social work management is also referred to as the management of enterprises in the social economy. Against this background, social work management can also be understood as a so-called specialised form of business administration for social enterprises or companies.

Some authors also understand social work management as the management of people with special consideration of human relationships in the sense of human resources management. However, this understanding does not apply to all social services organizations. A systemic approach to social work management also takes into account emotions, different meanings, and various relationships. When providing social services, the focus lies on the professional development of empathic and trusting relationships with the recipients of these servisce.

Theoretical Foundations 

The theoretical foundations of social work management are rooted in social work theories and principles as well as management studies. These theories help us understand how people act and how social and economic factors affect that behaviour. Theories like systems theory, psychodynamic theory, and human behaviour in the social environment theory are used to guide the way social work management is done. Understanding the theories behind social work management is important for making good decisions in the field that are socially sustainable.

Social Work management is an interdisciplinary and transdisciplinary subject that is marked by it hybrid function (see figure 1), including other academic disciplines such as business and economics, public management, social sciences, humanities, sustainability sciences, cultural studies, political sciences, law studies, etc.

Principles 
Some principles of social work management are also included in national quality standards (e.g. NASW Standards for Social Work Case Management).

Methods of Teaching and Learning 
Despite the fact that there is already a vast amount of literature available about management education and learning as well as social work education, the development of social work management education as a specific academic sub-discipline is still in progress and under discussion.

References 

Social work
Management
Social sciences
Education
Interdisciplinary subfields of economics
Transdisciplinarity